After pro-independence parties won a majority of seats in the Catalan election on 27 September 2015, the Declaration of the Initiation of the Process of Independence of Catalonia was issued on 9 November 2015. The declaration declares the start of the process to create an independent Catalan state in the form of a republic and proclaims the start of a participative, open, integrating and active citizens' constituent process to lay the foundation for the future Catalan Constitution.

The declaration was passed with 72 votes in favor, 63 against and 0 abstentions in the Parliament of Catalonia.

On 9 June 2017, the Catalan government announced the date of the independence referendum. It was declared illegal on 6 September 2017 and suspended by the Constitutional Court of Spain because it breached the Spanish Constitution of 1978. It was held on 1 October the same year, using a disputed voting process, resulting in a 90% majority of votes favouring independence with a turnout of 42.58%. Subsequently, the European Commission agreed that the referendum was illegal.

See also 
 Catalan independence
 2014 Catalan self-determination referendum
 2015 Catalan regional election
 Catalan Declaration of Sovereignty
 History of Catalonia
 Ibarretxe Plan

References

External links 
Resolution 1/XI of the Parliament of Catalonia, on the start of the political process in Catalonia as a consequence of the electoral results of 27 september 2015 

2015 in law
Catalan law
Catalan independence movement
2015 in Catalonia
Declarations of independence
Parliament of Catalonia
November 2015 events in Spain
2015 documents
November 2015 events in Europe